FC Kuban-Holding Pavlovskaya is a Russian football team based in Pavlovskaya, Krasnodar Krai. It was founded in 2015 and played on the amateur level. For 2020–21 season, it received the license for the third-tier Russian Professional Football League.

Current squad
As of 20 February 2023, according to the Second League website.

References

Association football clubs established in 2015
Football clubs in Russia
Sport in Krasnodar Krai
2015 establishments in Russia